Johnny Stewart may refer to:

Jonny Stewart (born 1990), Scottish footballer
Johnny Stewart (footballer, born 1872) (1872–?), English footballer
Johnny Stewart (rugby union) (born 1998), Irish rugby union player

See also
John Stewart (disambiguation)